Hjalmar Leo Mehr (November 19, 1910 – December 26, 1979) was a Swedish Social Democratic politician,  mayor of Stockholm (1958–1966, 1970–1971) and governor of Stockholm County (1971–1977). He promoted many radical socialist welfare state policies but is mostly remembered and criticized for the redevelopment of Norrmalm, where a significant part of the old Stockholm was demolished.

In 1969, Mehr was elected president of the newly established Swedish Association of Local Authorities (Svenska Kommunförbundet), an association that existed from 1969 to 2007 (now the Swedish Association of Regions) to interact with the Riksdag of Sweden.

Mehr's parents, Sara and Bernhard Meyerowitch, were Russian-Jewish revolutionaries who after the failed 1905 Russian Revolution fled to Sweden, where Hjalmar was born and named after Hjalmar Branting.

References

Jewish mayors
Jewish Swedish politicians
Mayors of Stockholm
Municipal commissioners of Sweden
Governors of Stockholm County
County governors of Sweden
Swedish Social Democratic Party politicians
Politicians from Stockholm
Swedish Jews
1910 births
1979 deaths
Swedish people of Russian-Jewish descent